Faith Winter (née Ashe; 1927–2017) was a British sculptor, notable for the statues and memorials to military and historical figures she created for British towns and cities.

Biography
Winter was born at Richmond outside of London and studied at the Guildford School of Art and the Chelsea School of Art. While a student she won the Feodora Gleichen prize of the Royal Society of Sculptors and had four pieces accepted for exhibition by the Royal Academy in London. Winter married an Army officer, Colonel Freddie Winter, and spent several years travelling and living abroad before returning to England and settling in Surrey in 1973.  She received two commissions that established her career as sculptor of portraits and public works. These were a group sculpture of military figures, The Soldiers which is now at the Blandford Camp in Dorset, and a portrait bust of Anne, the Princess Royal. Subsequently, Winter received further commissions for royal portraits and for public statues of military figures, most notably the statues of Hugh Dowding and Arthur Harris outside the church of Saint Clement Danes in London. 

Solo exhibitions of works by Winter were held at the Guildford House Gallery, Guildford, in 2002 and in 2005 at Gallery 27. Winter was a member of the Society of Portrait Sculptors and was made a Fellow of the Royal Society of Sculptors in 1983.  Winter had three children, two of whom, Alice and David also became artists.

Selected public works

Other works
 A 1992 sculpture of a child holding a carp for the Pearce Memorial fountain at Thame in Oxfordshire.
 Memorial for the Liberation of the Falkland Islands, 1984, Port Stanley
 The 15 Mysteries of the Rosary, 1984, The Church of Our Lady, Queen of Peace, Richmond, London
 Memorial Plaque – Mulberry Harbour Memorial, Arromanches, Normandy
 Spirit of Youth, Dundas Park, Canada.

References

External links

1927 births
2017 deaths
20th-century British sculptors
20th-century English women artists
21st-century British sculptors
21st-century English women artists
Alumni of Chelsea College of Arts
Alumni of the University for the Creative Arts
English women sculptors
People from Richmond, London
Sculptors from London